Facundo Agustín Batista Ochoa (born 16 January 1999) is a Uruguayan professional footballer who plays as a forward for Liga MX club Necaxa.

Club career
Batista played baby football for Siete Estrellas before joining Danubio. He left the club following an argument with a coach and joined rivals Defensor Sporting. In August 2018, he joined Swiss second division club Chiasso. He joined Brazilian club Ponte Preta on loan in March 2019.

Batista joined Portuguese club Académico Viseu on loan in August 2019. He played eight matches for the club and scored a goal before terminating his contract in January 2020.

Batista returned to Uruguay in January 2020 by signing for Deportivo Maldonado on a loan deal. He scored 16 goals from 40 matches for the club before terminating his contract on 30 June 2021.

On 17 September 2021, Batista joined Mexican club Necaxa.

International career
Batista is a former Uruguayan youth international. He was part of Uruguay squad which finished as third at 2019 South American U-20 Championship.

Honours
Uruguay U20
 South American Games silver medal: 2018

Individual
Uruguayan Primera División Young Player of the Year: 2020
Uruguayan Primera División Team of the Year: 2020

References

External links
 

Living people
1999 births
Footballers from Montevideo
Association football forwards
Uruguayan footballers
Uruguay under-20 international footballers
Uruguay youth international footballers
Swiss Challenge League players
Campeonato Brasileiro Série B players
Liga Portugal 2 players
Uruguayan Primera División players
Liga MX players
FC Chiasso players
Associação Atlética Ponte Preta players
Académico de Viseu F.C. players
Deportivo Maldonado players
Club Necaxa footballers
South American Games silver medalists for Uruguay
South American Games medalists in football
Uruguayan expatriate footballers
Uruguayan expatriate sportspeople in Switzerland
Uruguayan expatriate sportspeople in Brazil
Uruguayan expatriate sportspeople in Portugal
Uruguayan expatriate sportspeople in Mexico
Expatriate footballers in Switzerland
Expatriate footballers in Brazil
Expatriate footballers in Portugal
Expatriate footballers in Mexico